

History
O'Neal Steel, an O’Neal Industries affiliate, was founded in 1921 and is headquartered in Birmingham, Alabama. O'Neal Steel is one of the nation's largest family-owned, metal distributors and service centers. Today, O'Neal Steel operates 18 facilities across the United States and supplies a wide range of aluminum, alloy, hot-rolled, cold-finished, and stainless steel products. O'Neal Steel’s metals product line includes angle, bar, beam, pipe, plate, sheet, and more. O’Neal Steel also offers metal processing services such as tube lasering, forming, laser cutting, plasma cutting, shearing, oxy-fuel cutting, and sawing. In 2019, O’Neal Steel launched an industry-leading e-commerce platform, PRONTO.

Parent Company & Affiliates
O’Neal Industries (ONI) is a family of closely related companies, all engaged in the metals industry. Providing products and services that range from steel beams and plates to specialty alloys and complex manufactured components and tubing, ONI supplies customers across a variety of industries worldwide.

See also
Birmingham District

References

External links

O'Neal Steel (Manufacturing Services)

1921 establishments in Alabama
American companies established in 1921
Companies based in Birmingham, Alabama
Historic American Engineering Record in Alabama
Privately held companies based in Alabama